Perumangalam or Thiruperumangalam, is a village situated 4 km west of Vaitheeswarankoil and to the north-east of Thirupangur. This village was established during the Chola's Kingdom in the 10th century. One of the 63 Nayanars, Kalikama Nayanmar, lived in this village and served its people. This village was described well in the Sekizar Puranam written by the poet Sekizar, who was the minister of the second Kulothunga Cholan. Later, Vadukuveli was added to this village. The village has a very old ancient temple for kalikama Nayanmar at the V.koil. Apart from this temple, this village has many temples. For instance, Pichaiamman Aalayam, Uthrapadhiyar Temple, Mariamman Temple, a couple of Vinayagar Temple, Kaliamman Temple, Kanni Koil, and Kambarkoil. This Pichaiamman aalayam is very old and was damaged 400 years ago. The temple was renovated and the "Maha Kumbabishega pooja" was completed on 4 September 2008 by the people of the village and devotees..
Seven Matrika goddesses are dedicated to this temple. The name of the goddesses are

 Bramhi – Lord Brama's energy
 Maheswari – Lord Shiva's energy
 Kowmari – Lord Muruga's energy
 Vaishnavi – Lord Vishnu's energy
 Varahi – Lord Yama's energy
 Indhirani – Lord Indira's energy
 Samundi – An aspect of Mother's energy

Villages in Mayiladuthurai district